Almont may refer to:

Places

France
 Almont (river)

United States
 Almont, Colorado
 Almont, Iowa
 Almont, Michigan
 Almont Township, Michigan
 Almont, North Dakota
 Almont, Pennsylvania

See also
Almonte (disambiguation)